Great Grimsby was a non-metropolitan district in Humberside, England. It was abolished on 1 April 1996 and replaced by North East Lincolnshire.

Political control
Prior to 1974, Great Grimsby was a county borough, independent from any county council. Under the Local Government Act 1972 it became a non-metropolitan district, with Humberside County Council providing county-level services in the borough. The first election to the reconstituted borough council was held in 1973, initially operating as a shadow authority before coming into its revised powers on 1 April 1974. Political control of the council from 1973 until its abolition in 1996 was held by the following parties:

Council elections
1973 Grimsby Borough Council election
1976 Grimsby Borough Council election
1979 Great Grimsby Borough Council election (New ward boundaries)
1980 Great Grimsby Borough Council election
1982 Great Grimsby Borough Council election
1983 Great Grimsby Borough Council election
1984 Great Grimsby Borough Council election
1986 Great Grimsby Borough Council election
1987 Great Grimsby Borough Council election
1988 Great Grimsby Borough Council election
1990 Great Grimsby Borough Council election
1991 Great Grimsby Borough Council election
1992 Great Grimsby Borough Council election
1994 Great Grimsby Borough Council election

Borough result maps

By-election results

References

External links

 
Politics of Grimsby
Council elections in Humberside
District council elections in England